Hypocosmia definitalis is a species of snout moth in the genus Hypocosmia. It was described by Émile Louis Ragonot in 1891, and is known from Venezuela.

References

Moths described in 1891
Chrysauginae